"Vedic timeline" may refer to 
the Vedic period  of Indian prehistory (mid-2nd to mid-1st millennium BC)
the relative chronology of Vedic Sanskrit in historical linguistics
the mythological chronology associated with the Sanskrit epics
traditional Hindu units of time